William Osafo, known professionally as WillisBeatz, is a Ghanaian-born sound engineer, record producer and DJ from Takoradi. He is best known for producing Shatta Wale's hit singles "Taking Over","Forgetti","Sponsor" by Ebony Reigns and "Osey" by Nero X. WillisBeatz was nominated in the " Best Music Producer of the Year" category at the 2017 Ghana Entertainment Awards (USA).

Early life 
WillisBeatz, was born on August 30, 1991 in Takoradi. At age 17, William already had love for music and started learning music productions using the Internet. He attended the Takoradi Senior High School.

Production career

As a producer, WillisBeatz has been credited for working with most Ghanaian artists and producing hit songs like "'DON'T GO THERE", "TAKING OVER" and "FORGETTI" by Shatta Wale"Samba" by Gurunkz"Sponsor" by Ebony Reigns "Osey" by Nero X "Papabii" by Gallaxy and "Made In Taadi" by Kofi Kinaata.

Awards and nominations

Production discography

Singles
2013
Castro: Jealousy
2014
Nero X: Osey
2015
Gallaxy: Papabi
Kofi Kinaata: Made it Taadi
2016
Shatta Wale: Nana vs Mahama
Shatta Wale: Don't Go There
Gurunkz: Samba
2017
Shatta Wale: Taking Over
Shatta Wale: Forgetti
Shatta Wale: Open N Close
Shatta Wale: Skin Pain
Shatta Wale: Freedom
Ebony Reigns: Sponsor
Ebony Reigns: Maame Hw3
Kofi Kinaata: Last Show
Shatta Wale: Umbrella
Koti: Ayesem
MzVee: Sing My Name

References

External links
 Willis Beatz on Facebook

1991 births
Living people
Ghanaian record producers